The 2018 Asian Netball Championships is the 11th edition of the Asian Netball Championships was held in Singapore. The championships which was held at the OCBC Arena at the Singapore Sports Hub from September 1–9.

In the final, Sri Lanka won their fifth Asian title by defeating Singapore 69-50 as both teams qualified through to the 2019 Netball World Cup as the Asian representatives. Tharjini Sivalingam of Sri Lanka received the Player of the tournament award for her outstanding aggressive skills as she made a comeback into the national team after a 3 year hiatus.

Preliminary round

Group A

Group B

Group C

Group D

Follow-up Group

Group E (Cup)

Group F (Plate)

Group G (Bowl)

Play-off matches

11th place play-off

9th place play-off

7th place play-off

5th place play-off

Knockout stage

Semi-finals

3rd place play-off

Final

Final Placements

References

External links
 

2018
2018 in netball
Netball
2018
Netball
Netball